Rodriguez Canal was a ditch that cut across the battlefield during the Battle of New Orleans, 1815. Andrew Jackson arranged his defensive line behind it.

History
Rodriguez Canal is a disused millrace for a sawmill between the Chalmette and Macarty plantations. The dilapidated canal measured about four feet deep by twenty feet wide at the time of the Battle of New Orleans, and stood as a natural battlefield divide between the combatants. General Jackson arranged his defensive line behind this ditch, building ramparts behind it. Today, the canal ruins form part of the Jean Lafitte National Historical Park and Preserve.

Illustrations

References

Notes

Cited literature
 Cowan, Walter G. & al. (2001). New Orleans Yesterday and Today: A Guide to the City. Louisiana State University Press.
 Kilmeade, Brian & Yaeger, Don (2017). Andrew Jackson and the Miracle of New Orleans. Sentinel.

Battle of New Orleans
History of New Orleans
St. Bernard Parish, Louisiana